Léonce Fernand Crétin (1 March 1910 – 28 August 1994) was a French cross-country skier. He competed at the 1932 Winter Olympics and the 1936 Winter Olympics.

References

1910 births
1994 deaths
French male cross-country skiers
Olympic cross-country skiers of France
Cross-country skiers at the 1932 Winter Olympics
Cross-country skiers at the 1936 Winter Olympics
Sportspeople from Jura (department)
20th-century French people